Vandicholai Chinraasu is a 1994 Indian Tamil-language masala film directed and co-written by Manoj Kumar, and produced by Vivekananda Pictures. This remains the only Sathyaraj film as hero where A. R. Rahman composed the music. It was released on 15 April 1994, and received mixed reviews from critics.

Plot 

Chinnrasu lives with his father Rathnasamy and sister. Rathnasamy works in the forest office as a driver. Chinnrasu has an aim to become a district forest officer. Due to some problem, Rathnasamy gets a transfer order, and the family shifts in Vandicholai town. The first plot of the movie showcases the current situation of Chinnrasu. The movie starts from a scene where Chinnrasu is in the jail and will be hanged till death in a couple of month. Hearing this, Chinnrasu remembers his past life and how he gets such a punishment.

Cast 

Sathyaraj as Chinraasu
Sukanya as Parvathi
Sivaranjani as Kalyani
Anandaraj as Santhanapandian
Goundamani as Kittu
Delhi Ganesh as Rathnasamy
S. S. Chandran
Thalapathy Dinesh
Vichithra
Bhavani
Hariraj as Sankar
Vijay Krishnaraj as Jailer
Baby Sridevi as Lakshmi
Chitti
Yuvasri
Premi

Soundtrack 
The soundtrack was composed by A. R. Rahman and the lyrics were written by Vairamuthu, Pulamaipithan and Na. Kamarasan. For the dubbed Telugu version Bobbili Paparayudu, lyrics were written by Vennelakanti. The song "Senthamizh Naatu Thamizhachiye", despite its popularity, has received criticism for its seemingly sexist and misogynistic lyrics.

Release and reception 
Vandicholai Chinraasu was released on 15 April 1994, and received mixed reviews from critics. The Indian Express wrote, "There is nothing new in the story-line. Nor in the scenes. The performance are quite listless". K. Vijiyan of New Straits Times wrote that the film "is for die-hard Sathyaraj fans". R. P. R. of Kalki felt Sathyaraj's acting prowess was wasted. For the film's release in Malaysia, the last 20 minutes were deleted.

References

External links 
 

1990s masala films
1990s Tamil-language films
1994 films
Films scored by A. R. Rahman
Films set in forests